The Joseph E. England Jr. House is a historic house at 313 Skyline Drive in North Little Rock, Arkansas.  It is a -story brick and stone structure, set on a wedge-shaped lot with expansive views of the Arkansas River.  Built in 1928, it is a fine example of Tudor Revival architecture, and one of the Edgemont neighborhood's most elaborate pre-Depression houses.  It was built for a prominent local banker and businessman who was an associated of Edgemont's developer, Justin Matthews.

The house was listed on the National Register of Historic Places in 1992.

See also
National Register of Historic Places listings in Pulaski County, Arkansas

References

Houses on the National Register of Historic Places in Arkansas
Houses completed in 1928
Houses in North Little Rock, Arkansas
National Register of Historic Places in Pulaski County, Arkansas